Laizisi (Moguang Yi 磨光彝) is a recently discovered Loloish language spoken in Jidiping 吉地坪, Moguang Village 磨光村, Jindun Township 金墩乡, Heqing County, Yunnan, China.

References

Loloish languages